Ptahhotep was an ancient  Egyptian official of the Fifth Dynasty, most likely under king Djedkare Isesi. His most important office was that of a vizier, making him to the most important official at the royal court, only second to the king. Next to this important office he held further important titles, such as overseer of the treasuries, overseer of the scribes of the king's document, overseer of the six big houses and overseer of all royal works of the king. 

Ptahhotep is one of several viziers at the end of the Fifth Dynasty with this name. He is mainly known from is mastaba (C6) at Saqqara. The mastaba was built in one unit with the mastaba of another vizier, who was also called Ptahhotep with the second name Desher. They were perhaps brothers. In both mastabas were not found any inscriptions providing a clue for a dating. On observations on the style of the architecture it had been argued that they date to the reign of Menkauhor and Djedkare Isesi. Ptahhotep perhaps dating to the early years of the latter king.

References

Literature 

Viziers of the Fifth Dynasty of Egypt
Overseer of the treasury
Ancient Egyptian overseers of royal works